Johannes Hermandus Julius (Johan) Kayser (Harlingen, 11 November 1842 - 's-Hertogenbosch, 15 March 1917) was a Dutch architect, who was primarily engaged with the construction of churches. Apart from this he also designed schools and abbeys and oversaw many restoration projects.
In the 1860s he worked together with P.J.H. Cuypers, for whom he functioned as supervisor during the restoration of the Sint-Servaaskerk in Maastricht. 

In 1873 Kayser established himself as an independent architect in the city of Venlo, where he reached the position of the city's official architect. In 1891 he moved to Maastricht. He became prominent for his churches and abbeys which were designed in a Neo-Gothic style. At first his churches were inspired by the French Gothic tradition, but after 1878 he turned more tot the Gothic architecture of Northern Germany.

The Ursuline Convent in Eijsden (now the International Museum for Family History) was one of the major Neo-Gothic projects Kayser was involved in. The Ursuline sisters in Eijsden commissioned Pierre Cuypers to renovate and extend the building in 1899, and Cuypers turned to his old colleague for assistance in this project. The museum has dedicated exhibition rooms to the legacy of the Ursuline Sisters and the Neo-Gothic designs they commissioned.

See also

1842 births
1917 deaths
People from Harlingen, Netherlands
Dutch architects
Gothic Revival architects